Friendly Enemies is a 1925 American silent comedy thriller film directed by George Melford and starring Joe Weber, Lew Fields and Virginia Brown Faire. It is based on a 1918 play of the same title, and was part of a cluster of World War I-themed films released during the mid-1920s. It was remade as a sound film Friendly Enemies in 1942.

Plot
Two German immigrants have grown prosperous in the United States. However, when World War I breaks out Carl Pfeiffer remains sympathetic to the German Empire, even after America has entered the war. While his friend is steadfastly loyal to America, Pfeiffer provides funds and assistance to a German espionage ring. He unwittingly helps them plan to sabotage a troopship on which his own son is travelling to Europe to fight the Western Front. Pfeiffer has a dramatic change of heart and with the help of his friend and the American intelligence services he thwarts the plan and rounds up the enemy spy ring.

Cast

Preservation
With no prints of Friendly Enemies located in any film archives, it is a lost film.

References

Bibliography
Parish, James Robert & Pitts, Michael R. The Great Spy Pictures. Scarecrow Press, 1974. .

External links

Stills at silenthollywood.com

1920s comedy thriller films
1925 lost films
American silent feature films
American comedy thriller films
American black-and-white films
Films directed by George Melford
Producers Distributing Corporation films
1925 comedy films
1920s American films
Silent American comedy films
Silent thriller films
1920s English-language films